Lee Chaolan (Chinese: 李 超狼; pinyin: Lǐ Chāoláng; Japanese: リー・チャオラン; Hepburn: Rī Chaoran) is a player character from the Tekken fighting game franchise by Bandai Namco Entertainment. He is an orphan adopted by Heihachi Mishima, head of the Mishima Zaibatsu corporation, and later becoming embroiled in a one-sided rivalry with his adoptive brother, Kazuya Mishima. The defeat of Kazuya is Lee's primary objective in entering the King of Iron Fist fighting tournaments. Since making his debut in the original Tekken, Lee has been a mainstay in the series, appearing in every subsequent game except for Tekken 3, and has at times appeared as an alter ego named Violet, who is additionally playable in several series installments. Outside of the games, Lee has appeared in two animated Tekken films, and he has received a positive critical reception for his flamboyant personality and particularly his Tekken 5 ending.

Appearances

In video games
Lee is the Chinese adoptive son of Heihachi Mishima, whose own son Kazuya's defeat is Lee's motivation for entering the numerous King of Iron Fist tournaments held throughout the Tekken series. Lee was adopted by Heihachi to provide a rival for Kazuya, who he felt was too weak to lead his Mishima Zaibatsu company. Lee studies in the United States alongside Paul Phoenix and Marshall Law. After Kazuya wins control of the company, Lee works as Kazuya's secretary, in addition to overseeing Kazuya's team of bodyguards and Dr. Bosconovitch's experiments, all while secretly hoping to take over the Zaibatsu. However, Lee is soon expelled from the Zaibatsu for unknown reasons while Heihachi disowns him, causing him to leave the world of fighting and pursuing a career in robotics.

Lee returns in Tekken 4 as a playboy whose robotics operation is a success. Upon learning that the Zaibatsu's rival G Corporation was attacked by the Tekken Force, Lee joins the fourth tournament after changing his appearance and calling himself Violet in order to conceal his identity, while hoping to test his new "Combot" experiment in the process. However, he is defeated in the later stages by Kazuya, whom Lee had believed to be dead, but he then learns someone else had controlled the Zaibatsu in Heihachi's absence. Believing it to be Kazuya, Lee enters the fifth tournament in Tekken 5 to take him out personally and regain control of the Zaibatsu, but upon learning that the culprit is Lee's adoptive paternal grandfather Jinpachi, he drops out of the tournament and returns to his business. After Kazuya legitimately takes control of the company, Lee enters the next tournament in attempt again to come in contact with Kazuya. In the game's "Scenario Campaign" story mode, Lee joins forces with Julia Chang, Lars Alexandersson, and Dr. Bosconovitch's android daughter Alisa, due to their shared objective of stopping Kazuya and Jin, but Lee and Lars are not aware at first that Alisa was created to serve Jin, thus acting as a mole for Lars. When Alisa is destroyed at the climax, Lee promises Lars that she will be reconstructed with his company's resources, which he finally succeeded at the same time of Heihachi's return in the seventh tournament, shortly before the latter’s true demise at the hands of Kazuya in their final battle. During the seventh tournament, Lee also recruits a journalist who lost his family since the war in the sixth tournament, in order to help him and Lars, as well as a redeemed Jin to investigate how the Mishima affair first started.

Lee is selectable in the noncanonical games Tekken Tag Tournament, Tekken Tag Tournament 2, Tekken 3D: Prime Edition, and Tekken Revolution.

Design and gameplay

The first Tekken features Lee wearing a simple purple vest and black pants, a color palette that would regularly be used for the character. In Tekken 4, Lee has a more formal design with a purple dress shirt, white vest and matching pants. Lee's primary outfit for Tekken 5 and 6 is a retread of his original costume from the first game embellished with a fishnet undershirt and a black collar. An alternate Tekken 5 costume was designed by manga artist and character designer Ryōji Minagawa. For Tekken Tag Tournament 2, Lee wears a black leather vest with a unicorn printed on the back. Lee's Tekken 7 design is his most elaborate, with a suit and tie worn beneath a long purple overcoat. A constant for Lee throughout his series appearances has been his silver hair, which, as Violet, changes to dark purple to go with an open-chested purple dress shirt and sunglasses. In response to a fan's tweet requesting Lee's inclusion in Tekken 7, Tekken producer Katsushiro Harada joked that a future installment would need to include "130 characters" to satisfy the series' fanbase.

GameSpy considered non-walled arenas in Tekken 4 and Tekken 5 to be a disadvantage for Lee players, but added that he was among "the faster characters in the game" with "good combo ability". The site said of Lee in Tekken 6, "Lee has the best use of Okizeme in the game", though his "attacks only have average reach and damage."  1UP.com wrote in 2013: "Playing mind games with your opponent is one of Lee’s specialties. After a juggle, you have the option to manipulate your opponent in whether to stay on the ground, roll back, or get straight back up." Tekken Tag Tournament 2 includes a "Fight Lab" tutorial, where players control training robot Combot under Violet's guidance and face a series of bizarre opponents.

In other media
Lee appears in the 1997 OVA Tekken: The Motion Picture as one of the main antagonists. In the film, he is mentioned as being a former underground fighter known as the Silver Devil. Heihachi plans to hand the Mishima Zaibatsu over to Kazuya should he defeat Heihachi in the upcoming tournament, but Lee wants the company for himself and therefore hires assassins Nina and Anna Williams to kill Kazuya, a task they repeatedly fail. During the tournament, Lee tests his new experiments on the fighters: humanoid dinosaurs called Rex (based on Alex). His plan backfires as Anna is devoured by one of the creatures, while Kazuya kills the others before scaring the last surviving one away. Lee then confronts Kazuya at the doors of the Zaibatsu tower, but he is beaten with a single punch and Heihachi discards him for being worthless. Lee subsequently commits suicide by entering the tower, killing all its security personnel before setting the island's self-destruction sequence, and remaining inside when it explodes. The explosion causes a chain reaction that takes out the entire island that had served as the tournament grounds, but both Kazuya and Heihachi escape in time. Lee was voiced by Shin-ichiro Miki in the original Japanese version, and by David Stokey in the English dub.

Lee's personality differs in the 2011 CGI film Tekken: Blood Vengeance, in which he has a minor role as a wealthy and eccentric teacher at Kyoto International School. He aids Alisa, Ling Xiaoyu, and Panda during an escape by providing them shelter, but part of his mansion is later destroyed in a fight between Anna and Nina. He was voiced by Ryôtarô Okiayu in the original Japanese version, and by Kaiji Tang in the English dub.

Lee appears in the YouTube webseries, "Tekken Stop Motion Web Series" in episode 2 where he battles Kazuya.

Reception

Elton Jones of Complex described Lee in 2012 as "Heihachi's adopted son and the man that invented 'swagged out martial arts.'" Tom Goulter of GamesRadar remarked on Lee's adoption into the Mishima family: "One suspects that the entire storyline of Tekken would be rendered void if anyone had just given the young Heihachi some decent parenting literature." Gavin Jasper of 4thletter.net ranked Lee's Tag Tournament 2 ending, in which a tuxedo-clad Lee nonchalantly beats up a group of soldiers while walking with his assistant to his robotics laboratory, 125th in his 2013 rating of the 200 greatest fighting game endings: "When people describe someone as being 'like a boss,' they’re really comparing him to Lee Chaolan."  Mike Luces of International Business Times considered Lee's inclusion in Tekken 7 to be a "highlight" of the game. Rich Knight of Complex ranked Lee's appearance in Tekken: Blood Vengeance as the fifth-"craziest" Tekken series moment in 2012: "Lee is probably one of the weirdest characters we’ve ever seen, as he’s giving random thumbs up and calling young girls his 'kittens.'" Charles Webb of MTV.com described Lee's extravagant mansion in the film as "the definition of 'swag'". In an official fan poll hosted by Namco in 2012, Lee was the eleventh-most requested Tekken character (9.28% of 88,280 votes) for inclusion in the crossover fighter Tekken X Street Fighter.

Lee's Tekken 5 ending, which depicts him living luxuriously with Heihachi as his personal servant dressed only in swim briefs and a bow tie, has received critical attention for its perceived homoeroticism. In 2009, Michael Harradence of PlayStation Universe ranked it as the seventh-greatest Tekken ending of all time: "Lee enjoys the fruits of his labor and humiliates Heihachi by having him serve as his thong-wearing poolside lackey." However, Cracked.com included it in their 2013 feature "6 Video Game Endings That Are Clearly F#@%ing With Us," commenting: "There is not a doubt in my mind that the makers of that cutscene had to delete 40 minutes of video because the rating system would not allow for a full-length hardcore gay porno." In his 2013 feature "10 Video Game Endings with Disturbing Implications You Totally Missed", Simon Gallagher of WhatCulture placed Lee's ending third: "All of this strange Oedipal mesh plays out as both men are wearing nothing more than speedos ... and we are encouraged to laugh at the misfortune of the fallen villain (as well as marvel at his firm, ancient body) while he is powerless to run or fight back. Seriously?" Lee was listed as the number one best Tekken character by Gavin Jasper at Den of Geek, whom observed "With Tekken being about taking the main hero trope and turning it on its head, Lee is an extension of that who has unexpectedly become the coolest guy in the whole series."

Notes

References

Adoptee characters in video games
Fictional businesspeople in video games
Fictional Chinese people in video games
Fictional Japanese people in video games
Fictional martial artists in video games
Fictional Jeet Kune Do practitioners
Fictional mercenaries in video games
Fictional secretaries
Fictional inventors in video games
Male characters in video games
Male video game villains
Orphan characters in video games
Tekken characters
Video game characters introduced in 1994